Washington State University created its Global Campus on July 2, 2012. It combines the university's online-based instructional programs and offerings, and adds programs designed to bring online education to a wider audience.

References

External links
 WSU Global Campus website
 WSU Online Degrees and Programs

Washington State University
Distance education institutions based in the United States
Adult education in the United States
2012 establishments in Washington (state)
Educational institutions established in 2012